is a dam in Nagano Prefecture, Japan on the Sai River.

References

Dams in Nagano Prefecture